is a passenger railway station in located in the town of Aridagawa, Arida District, Wakayama Prefecture, Japan, operated by West Japan Railway Company (JR West).

Lines

Station layout
The station consists of two opposed side platforms connected by an elevated station building. The station is staffed.

Platforms

Adjacent stations

|-
!colspan=5|West Japan Railway Company (JR West)

History
Fujinami Station opened on August 8, 1926. With the privatization of the Japan National Railways (JNR) on April 1, 1987, the station came under the aegis of the West Japan Railway Company. A new station building was completed in March 2008.

Passenger statistics
In fiscal 2019, the station was used by an average of 1261 passengers daily (boarding passengers only).

Surrounding Area
 
 Arita Driving School
 Otani Onsen

See also
List of railway stations in Japan

References

External links

 Fujinami Station Official Site

Railway stations in Wakayama Prefecture
Railway stations in Japan opened in 1926
Aridagawa, Wakayama